Craig Harrison (born 1942 in Leeds, Yorkshire) is a British-New Zealand author, playwright, scriptwriter, and retired university lecturer, probably best known for his novel The Quiet Earth, which was published in 1982. Harrison's output has ranged widely, from science fiction to junior fiction, to comedies parodying academia. All of his books were published first in his adopted home of New Zealand.

Bibliography

Novels 
 How To Be A Pom (1975)
 Broken October: New Zealand, 1985 (1976 A.H. and A.W. Reed Ltd) – Novelisation of the play 'Tomorrow Will Be A Lovely Day' 
 The Quiet Earth (1981 - Coronet Books) 
 Ground Level (1981) – Novelization of earlier play 'Ground Level'
 Days of Starlight (1988), 
 Grievous Bodily (1991)
 The Dumpster Saga (2007)

Plays 
 Tomorrow Will Be a Lovely Day (1974)
 Ground Level (1981)
 The Whites of Their Eyes (1975)
 Perfect Strangers (1976)
 Hearts of Gold (1983)
 White Lies (1994)

References

External links

Profile at the New Zealand Book Council

1942 births
English dramatists and playwrights
English emigrants to New Zealand
English science fiction writers
Living people
Academic staff of the Massey University
20th-century New Zealand dramatists and playwrights
Writers from Leeds
English male dramatists and playwrights
English male novelists
English male non-fiction writers
New Zealand male dramatists and playwrights
20th-century New Zealand novelists